Our Lady of Ransom may refer to:
Feast of Our Lady of Ransom
Order of the Blessed Virgin Mary of Mercy, also known as Our Lady of Ransom
Depictions of Mary as the Virgin of Mercy